The 2017 FC Atyrau season is the 17th successive season that the club will play in the Kazakhstan Premier League, the highest tier of association football in Kazakhstan.

Season events
Prior top the start of the season, Zoran Vulić replaced Stoycho Mladenov as manager.

Vulić resigned from his position on 11 April citing family reasons, with Sergei Pavlov being announced as his replacement on 13 April 2017. Atyrau's away game against Aktobe on 16 April, was postponed as Aktobe's pitch at their stadium was not ready after an extended period of winter weather. Sergei Pavlov resigned as manager on 21 September with the club in 11th position.

Squad

Transfers

Winter

In:

Out:

Summer

In:

Out:

Competitions

Kazakhstan Premier League

Results summary

Results by round

Results

League table

Kazakhstan Cup

Final

Squad statistics

Appearances and goals

|-
|colspan="14"|Players away from Atyrau on loan:
|-
|colspan="14"|Players who left Atyrau during the season:

|}

Goal scorers

Disciplinary record

References

External links
 Official website
 Official VK

FC Atyrau seasons
Atyrau